The following is a list of the 74 municipalities (comuni) of the Aosta Valley, Italy.

List

References

 
 
Aosta
Geography of Aosta Valley